The electoral district of Noble Park was an electoral district of the Legislative Assembly in the Australian state of Victoria.

Members

Election results

References

Former electoral districts of Victoria (Australia)
1976 establishments in Australia
1985 disestablishments in Australia